Khairtabad Mosque is in Khairatabad. Today Khairtabad is a well-known locality built around the mosque. The area had become a major business and IT hub of Hyderabad, India.

History
Khairtabad Mosque was built by Khairunisa Begum in 1626 AD, also known as Ma Saheba, daughter of VI Sultan Muhammad Qutb Shah (1612–1626 AD). She built the mosque for her tutor Akhund Mulla Abul Malik.

There is an empty domed building adjacent to the mosque. The reason for its being devoid of any grave is that it was built by Akhund for self burial; as he died during his pilgrimage to Haj in Mecca, the dome remains vacant.

Khairunisa Begum asked his son-in-law Hussain Shah Wali to construct a palace, a mosque and a tank for the princess. The tank later became famous as Hussain Sagar, built in the northern boundary of Khairtabad.

Architecture

Khairatabad Mosque was designed and constructed by Hussain Shah Wali. The mosque has a three-arch opening in front. The slender minarets of the mosque have lot of decorative work and the Jali (net) work is worth seeing.

INTACH AP, India had declared it as a heritage site.

Reference List

Citations 

Religious buildings and structures completed in 1626
17th-century mosques
Mosques in Hyderabad, India
Tourist attractions in Hyderabad, India
Heritage structures in Hyderabad, India
Hyderabad State
1626 establishments in India
Qutb Shahi architecture